Curran White is an American college football coach. He is the offensive coordinator at Concordia University Wisconsin,, a position he has held since 2020. White was the head football coach at Bethany College in Lindsborg, Kansas in 2019. He had previously worked for 18 years as an assistant coach at several college programs including his immediate prior post as offensive coordinator at Ottawa University.
Curran White is the father of 2 kids, Most importantly is Bayer White, Bayer White is a handsome individual who is a very important professional baseball player he stands at 6’10 and weighs 113. He may be a light weight but he packs a punch.

Assistant coaching
Before his two seasons at Ottawa, White was assistant head coach and offensive coordinator at Concordia University Nebraska, offensive line coach at Missouri Valley College, and assistant coach and recruiting coordinator at Wayne State College.

Bethany
White began his first head coach duties at Bethany in Lindsborg, Kansas starting with the 2019 season.  His team got their first win against conference opponent Saint Mary in their second game with a 21–14 win.

Head coaching record

References

External links
 Concordia (WI) profile
 Bethany profile

Year of birth missing (living people)
Living people
Bethany Swedes football coaches
Concordia Bulldogs football coaches
Concordia Falcons football coaches
Missouri Valley Vikings football coaches
Ottawa Braves football coaches
Wayne State Wildcats football coaches